Korby Lenker is an American folk and Americana singer-songwriter as well as an author of short stories. He is known for his album Thousand Springs and his book of short stories, Medium Hero. The son of a mortician and a school teacher, Lenker was born in 1976 in Twin Falls, Idaho, and now resides in Nashville, Tennessee. Lenker maintains an active touring schedule.

Career 
As a high school student in Twin Falls, Idaho, Lenker fronted the alt-rock band Clockwork Orange. In 2001, he relocated to Bellingham, Washington, where he founded the alt-bluegrass band The Barbed Wire Cutters while attending Western Washington University. The band released two albums, the self-titled The Barbed Wire Cutters (2002) and Full Moon to Rise (2003). While still touring with The Barbed Wire Cutters, Lenker began recording solo work, including the albums First Takes (2001), The Ghost of Whiteboy (2002) and Bellingham (2003). Lenker then moved to Seattle, Washington, to continue his solo career, before relocating to Nashville in 2007. In 2017, he released Thousand Springs. The album was recorded outside the recording studio at locations that held special meaning to Lenker, from his favorite bookstore to his father's mortuary.  His album Man in the Maroon will be released May 21, 2021, on GrindEthos Records.

Discography

Other works 
Lenker's first book Medium Hero: And Other Stories is a collection of twenty-seven short stories inspired by Lenker's years as a touring indie artist. The original version was self-published. Turner Publishing acquisitions manager Stephanie Beard picked up the book at one of his performances. As a result, Turner Publishing offered Lenker a contract and consequently published the book on December 1, 2015.

In 2018, Lenker launched the web series Morse Code about a struggling musician trying to balance his personal and professional life. It was produced in part by funds raised in a Patreon campaign. The pilot episode Boomerang, which was written by and stars Lenker, released to the public on August 3, 2018 on Vimeo.

Collaborations 
In 2004, Lenker collaborated with Stell Newsome (performing together as David Goliath) to produce an album of bluegrass gospel standards called David Goliath's Old Time Gospel Hour. He co-wrote the song "Friend and a Friend" with Molly Tuttle. The song was consequently released on Lenker's album Thousand Springs and Tuttle's album Rise in 2017. In 2017, he co-wrote the song "Let's Just Have Supper" with Nora Jane Struthers. The song and its accompanying music video premiered on NPR.

Awards 
In 2006, Lenker won second place in the country category during the Chris Austin Songwriting Contest at MerleFest with his song "Handful of Dice." In 2007, Lenker took first place in the Chris Austin Songwriting Contest in the gospel category with his song "Blessed Be That Day." " In 2016, he won first place at the Rocky Mountain Folks Festival Songwriters' Showcase.

Music videos

References 

Americana music
Living people
1976 births
People from Twin Falls, Idaho
Musicians from Nashville, Tennessee
21st-century American singers
Singer-songwriters from Tennessee
Singer-songwriters from Idaho